Pendleton House may refer to:

in the United States (by state then city)
William Kimbrough Pendleton House, Eustis, Florida, listed on the NRHP in Lake County
 Col. Edmund Pendleton House, Clintonville, Kentucky, listed on the NRHP in Clark County
 Pendleton House (Falmouth, Kentucky), listed on the NRHP in Pendleton County
 Pendleton House (Hartford, Kentucky), listed on the NRHP in Ohio County
 James G. Pendleton House, Searsport, Maine, listed on the NRHP in Waldo County
 Pendleton Ruin, Animas, New Mexico, listed on the NRHP in Hidalgo County
George Hunt Pendleton House, Cincinnati, Ohio, listed on the NRHP